Aaron Philipp Herzog (born 30 January 1998) is a German professional footballer who plays as a midfielder for Hallescher FC.

Career
Herzog made his professional debut for Hansa Rostock in the first round of the 2020–21 DFB-Pokal on 13 September 2020, coming on as a substitute in the 81st minute for Jan Löhmannsröben against Bundesliga club VfB Stuttgart. The home match finished as a 1–0 loss.

References

External links
 
 
 
 
 

1998 births
Living people
Footballers from Cologne
German footballers
Germany youth international footballers
Association football midfielders
Borussia Mönchengladbach II players
FC Hansa Rostock players
Hallescher FC players
Regionalliga players